Manuel Maria da Terra Brum (2 February 1825 – 11 July 1905) was a merchant, winegrower, and the third Baron of Alagoa on the island of Faial in the Portuguese archipelago of the Azores.

Biography
Manuel Maria da Terra Brum was born on 2 February 1825 into some of Faial's oldest and most illustrious families, including the Brums, Terras, and Silveiras. His parents were morgado José Francisco da Terra Brum, first Baron of Alagoa and last Captain-mor of Faial, and Francisca Paula Brum e Silveira.

Like his father before him, Manuel was one of the largest winegrowers on neighboring Pico Island, producing 1000 barrels of Verdelho wine annually.

Business ventures and baronage
A cultured and practical businessman, Brum dedicated his life to the "development of industry, agriculture, vineyards and noble exploration of all the sources of wealth in Faial and Pico". After his first voyage abroad he created the Quinta da Silveira (Estate of Silveira) in Santo Amaro, which became "one of the richest and more beautiful properties in the Azores, rivaling the decanted gardens of São Miguel". In fact, Brum "was to the islands of Faial and Pico, what for the island of the Archangel [São Miguel] were the Cantos and the Jácomes Correias, his friends and correspondents." Powdery mildew and phylloxera spread to the Azores in 1852 and 1873, respectively, destroying vineyards and ruining the livelihoods of poor inhabitants of Pico and rich property owners of Horta alike. Battling against this, Manuel Maria introduced new castes to Pico including American grape varieties. His initiative provoked a renaissance in Pico's wines, as other winegrowers adopted new castes, resulting in new wines. During the course of this conversion, Manuel Maria spent much of his fortune—even selling off his estate for a time—but succeeded in recuperating his investment and buying back his property.

Recognizing Brum's contribution to the people of the Faial-Pico Channel, King Carlos I of Portugal on a 1901 visit to the Azores granted Brum the title of third Baron of Alagoa, a title that had been extinguished with the death of his brother José Francisco da Terra Brum II in 1844.

Later life
Brum was involved in various philanthropic works and construction projects. On 28 November 1859 he was one of the founders of the fraternal Sociedade Amor da Pátria (Love of the Fatherland Society), serving as its president for several years. He was also president of the board of the Caixa Económica Faialense (Savings Bank of Faial) and responsible for construction of the road along Vista Alegre. 

He had no direct descendants, leaving his house along Areia Larga, estate in Alagoa, and various vineyards, furniture, dinnerware, and boats to António da Cunha de Menezes Brum and José Bettencourt V. Correia é Ávila, his workers José Pereira and José Francisco de Medeiros, and his servants Ricarda Luísa and Constança Margarida, with the rest of his fortune being equally divided between his nephews. His funeral took place on the afternoon of 12 July 1905. His body was escorted by directors from Amor da Pátria, Luz e Caridade ("Light and Charity"), and the Asilo da Infância Desvalida (Asylum for Destitute Children), the lattermost of which he was protector and president.

References

Notes

Sources

Terra Brum
People from Faial Island
Azorean nobility
1825 births
1905 deaths
Portuguese nobility